Jackson Township is one of thirteen townships in Parke County, Indiana, United States. As of the 2010 census, its population was 737 and it contained 475 housing units.

History
Jackson Township was named for Andrew Jackson, 7th President of the United States.

The Big Rocky Fork Covered Bridge, Mansfield Covered Bridge, and Mansfield Roller Mill are listed on the National Register of Historic Places.

Geography

Unincorporated towns
 Alma Lake at 
 Lena at 
 Mansfield at 
(This list is based on USGS data and may include former settlements.)

Cemeteries
The township contains these two cemeteries: Jacks and Moore.

Major highways
  Indiana State Road 59

Lakes
 Alma Lake
 Rocky Fork Lake

School districts
 Clay Community Schools

Political districts
 State House District 44
 State Senate District 38

References
 
 United States Census Bureau 2009 TIGER/Line Shapefiles
 IndianaMap

External links
 Indiana Township Association
 United Township Association of Indiana
 City-Data.com page for Jackson Township

Townships in Parke County, Indiana
Townships in Indiana